Shusterman is a surname. Notable people with the surname include:

Dalia Shusterman (born 1973), Canadian-American musician
Melissa Shusterman (born 1967), American politician
Naum Shusterman (1912–1976), Soviet military officer
Neal Shusterman (born 1962), American writer
Richard Shusterman (born 1949), American philosopher